Čadram is a settlement in the Municipality of Oplotnica in the Upper Carniola region in eastern Slovenia. It lies immediately east of Oplotnica itself. The area is part of the traditional region of Styria. The municipality is now included in the Drava Statistical Region.

A church on Lačna gora hill northwest of the settlement is dedicated to Saints Hermagoras and Fortunatus and belongs to the parish of Čadram-Oplotnica. It dates to the 14th century with 17th-century restyling.

References

External links
Čadram on Geopedia

Populated places in the Municipality of Oplotnica